Sissel is a 1986 album from Norwegian singer Sissel Kyrkjebø. It was her debut album which contained different genres and styles. According to her, "....The songs tell different facets of love." It was sold more than 400,000 copies soon after the release, making it the best selling album in Norway at that time, in a country with a population of 4.16 million (in 1986).

Charts

Track listing

Norway version
01. Kjærlighet
02. Tenn et lys for dem
03. Jeg trenger deg
04. Summertime
05. I ditt smil
06. Eg ser
07. Å Vestland, Vestland
08. Vil du vekke tonen min?
09. Inn til deg
10. Frøet
11. Det skal lyse en sol
12. Dagen gryr

Sweden version
01. Kärleken
02. Har en dröm
03. Vem
04. Tänd ett ljus
05. In till dig
06. Jag ser
07. Det skall lysa en sol 
08. Summertime
09. Å Vestland, Vestland  
10. Låt mej vara nära dej
11. Dagen gryr

Denmark version
01. Vårvise (duet with Sebastian)
02. Har en dröm
03. Summertime
04. Kärleken
05. I ditt smil
06. Jag ser
07. Inn til deg
08. Vil du vekke tonen min?
09. Å Vestland, Vestland
10. Rosen
11. Det skall lysa en sol
12. Dagen gryr

References

1986 debut albums
Sissel Kyrkjebø albums